The Foreign Minister of the Republic of Latvia is the head of the Ministry of Foreign Affairs and is charged with being the architect Latvian foreign policy and carrying out diplomatic orders by the President of Latvia. The position was first created in 1918 after Latvian independence, and re-established in May 1990 following the restoration of the country's independence from the USSR. Since October 2011, the position has been held by Edgars Rinkēvičs.

List of Ministers

See also
 Ministry of Foreign Affairs (Latvia)

 
Foreign Affairs minister